The Western Fair is a fair held annually in London, Ontario, Canada in early September.

History

The first Western Fair was held in September 1868 in downtown London, northeast of the current location of Victoria Park. Organizers had hoped to use the Crystal Palace Barracks as the main exhibition area. Livestock shows took place on the parade grounds outside the Crystal Palace.

In 1887, when the fair gained legal status through the Provincial Charter and Act of Incorporation, it moved to 900 King Street in east London, where the fairgrounds remain today. The present fairgrounds were purchased for $65,000. Except for an eight-year period between 1939 and 1947 when the Canadian Department of National Defence occupied the grounds & 2020–2021, the Western Fair has operated on the new site.

John Huse Saunders was President of the Western Fair Association (WFA) for 22 years. He devoted more than 50 years to the Western Fair and was known throughout North America as a poultry breeder. After receiving Honorary Presidential status the WFA changed the by-laws and limited the term to three years.

In 2011, the former Western Fair Association re-branded itself as the Western Fair District, to better represent the reality that the grounds and building facilities had expanded beyond a 9-day fair to year-round activities.

With 2020 & 2021's cancellation on grounds because of the COVID-19 pandemic, the 145th was deferred to 2021.

The fair
The Western Fair runs during the second full week of September, starting on Friday and ending on Sunday.

The original basis for the Western Fair was agricultural displays, arts and crafts, and vendors, with a heavy emphasis on competition. Later additions included the midway and booked entertainment acts. A seasonal harness racetrack was opened in 1961, with simulcast betting added later. The racetrack was later separated from the fair proper.

The only 24-hour food vendor at the Western Fair, St. Anne's Church, served meals at the Western Fair from 1947 until 2015, with the proceeds going to local charities and to fund church activities. In 2016, St. Anne's Church did not renew its contract after new regulations restricted its operations to fair open hours only, which would have forced it to operate at a loss.

Facilities
The Western Fairgrounds are open 12 months a year. In addition to the fair itself, the fairgrounds are also home to the Western Fair Raceway, the OLG casino slot machines, an agricultural complex, and several large buildings which are frequently rented out for events. It also used to be home to the former Western Fair Museum and Archives and the former IMAX theatre, both of which closed in 2005. The IMAX theatre was taken over by London Musical Theatre Productions in 2007.

Raceway and slot machines
London's primary standardbred horse racing facility is the Western Fair Raceway. A slot machine facility on the site was opened to the public on September 28, 1999, as authorised by the Ontario Lottery and Gaming Corporation. As of April 2008, the facility contained 750 slot machines and has seen 9.4 million people, supported by a $15 million staff budget.

Museum and archives
The Western Fair Museum and Archives began with the efforts of Inge Sanmyia, who was working on her PhD in history at Wilfrid Laurier University in Waterloo, Ontario in 1997. Her three-month summer research project soon became the foundations for the Western Fair Museum and Archives. Since 1997 she has designed historical displays for the Fair and written its history: A Celebration of Excellence: The history of the Western Fair. During its existence, the WFA Museum and Archives accumulated material from the Western Fair, members of the public and historians, and catalogued the Western Fair Archives list of photographs. Through the acquisition of these materials, the museum put on regular short and long-term displays as well as distinct displays during each fall fair. For example:

Transportation and the Fair 1999
The Great War 2001
Ann May (Dingwall) Queen of the Cowgirls 2002
Tings to Remember 2003
London Firefighters 2004

In its efforts to record and catalogue the material it had acquired, an extensive systems of records and labelling was set up and a Finding Aid was designed and installed in the in-house computer system for easy access. The Museum was affiliated with: Canadian Museums Association, Canadian Heritage Information Network, and Virtual Museum of Canada.

Examples of Headings
WFA = Western Fair Association
WF = Western Fair
HS = Horse Show
LSC = Livestock Catalogue
FS = Farm Show
SPF = Sports Fair
ND = No Date
PL = Prize Lists

Examples of Series codes by Box
1	WFA 1000A
6	HS 7000
7	LSC 7000

Examples of Archival Box Contents
Box No. 3	WFA 1000C
City presentation 1970 Fair expansion
Government of Canada (ND) Exhibition survey
Comparison of State Fairs 1969 US & Canada
Midway games proposal (ND)
Central Canada Exhibition Association(CCEA) 1972 Survey
International Association of Fairs & Expositions 1985 Directory
Report of Western Fair Research

IMAX theatre
An IMAX film theatre was situated at the Western Fair site for nine years, closing on September 30, 2005, due to low attendance (an average of only 100,000 patrons per year). After the IMAX equipment was removed, the theatre was leased and renovated by Dale Henderson, a retired engineer and former leader of the Stardust Orchestra, who opened the London City Music Theatre in October 2007.

See also
Other Canadian annual and/or agricultural fairs
 Canadian National Exhibition – Toronto
 Calgary Stampede – Calgary
 Edmonton K-Days – Edmonton
 Pacific National Exhibition – Vancouver
 Central Canada Exhibition – Ottawa
 Canadian Lakehead Exhibition – Thunder Bay
 Markham Fair – Markham, Ontario
 Red River Exhibition – Winnipeg
 Royal Agricultural Winter Fair – Toronto
 Royal Manitoba Winter Fair – Brandon, Manitoba
 Schomberg Fair – Schomberg, Ontario
 Sooke Fall Fair – Sooke, British Columbia

Footnotes

References

External links

 Western Fair District

Annual fairs
Casinos in Ontario
Horse racing venues in Ontario
Recurring events established in 1866
Agriculture in Canada
Festivals in London, Ontario
Fairs in Ontario
1866 establishments in Canada
Companies based in London, Ontario
Festivals established in 1866
Fairgrounds in Canada